John Leonard Price (1877 – after 1908) was an English professional footballer who played in the Football League for Small Heath, Doncaster Rovers and Stockport County.

Price was born in Birmingham. He began his football career with Shenstone BC before joining Small Heath in August 1897. He was a regular in the reserve team in the Birmingham & District League, but only appeared once for the first team, playing at inside right in the last game of the 1898–99 season, a goalless draw away against Leicester Fosse in the Second Division. Price left the club after being charged with assaulting a railway station ticket collector. He went on to play for Watford in the Southern League before returning to the Football League with Doncaster Rovers and Stockport County. By 1909, he was reserve-team trainer at Fulham.

References

1877 births
Year of death missing
Footballers from Birmingham, West Midlands
English footballers
Association football forwards
Birmingham City F.C. players
Watford F.C. players
Doncaster Rovers F.C. players
Stockport County F.C. players
English Football League players
Southern Football League players
Date of birth missing
Place of death missing